Kotia may refer to:
 Kotia language, a variety of the Odia language of Odisha, India
 Kotia, Mahendragarh, a village in Haryana, India
 Kotia, Koraput, a village in Odisha, India
 Navika Kotia, Indian actress

See also 
 Cotia
 Kotiya (disambiguation)
 Kottia, a town in Burkina Faso
 Kutia